Delhi Durbar Medals were instituted by the United Kingdom to commemorate the Delhi Durbar where the new Emperor of India was proclaimed, in 1903 for Edward VII, and in 1911 for George V. On both occasions the medals were one and a half inches in diameter and were awarded in both gold and silver. They were worn in date order alongside Coronation and Jubilee medals on the left chest, suspended from a ribbon one and a quarter inches wide. These Royal commemorative medals were worn before campaign medals until November 1918, after which the order of wear was changed, with them now worn after campaign medals and before long service awards.

Delhi Durbar Medal, 1911
Obverse: The conjoined crowned busts of King George V and Queen Mary facing left within a floral wreath of roses.Reverse: A legend in Persian, which translates as The Durbar of George V, Emperor of India, Master of the British Land.The medal was awarded unnamed.

Two hundred gold medals were struck for award to ruling chiefs and high ranking officials.  30,000 silver medals were struck, with 26,800 awarded to civic dignitaries, government officials, and including 10,000 to officers and men of the British and Indian armies. The medal was distributed, not only to those present at the Durbar, but to others throughout India who contributed to the Raj.

The ribbon was the same as for the medal for King George's Coronation, and while the obverse design is the same, the Durbar Medal is larger, being 1½ inches in diameter, compared with 1¼ inches for the Coronation Medal. Both medals could not be worn together, and those eligible for both wore a clasp bearing the word 'Delhi' on the ribbon of the Coronation Medal.

Durbar clasp for Coronation Medal ribbon

See also
 Delhi Durbar Medal (1903)
 Delhi Durbar
 British colonial India
 Empress of India Medal

References

Orders, decorations, and medals of the British Empire
Orders, decorations, and medals of India
Orders, decorations, and medals of British India
Orders, decorations, and medals of the United Kingdom
1911 establishments in the United Kingdom
1911 disestablishments in the United Kingdom